The río Ocosito is a river in Guatemala. The river's sources are located in the Sierra Madre mountain range in Quetzaltenango. It flows southwards to Retalhuleu and then west to the Pacific Ocean.

References

External links
Map of Guatemala including principal rivers, from University of Texas

Rivers of Guatemala